The 2007 South Africa rugby union tour of Europe were a series of rugby union matches played in November and December 2007 in Europe featuring the 2007 Rugby World Cup winners South Africa. Although the matches had been arranged well in advance of the World Cup, the mini-tour was seen as an opportunity for South Africa to showcase their talents and to say farewell to their outgoing coach, Jake White, who retired after the second game. In the event, several members of the World Cup squad were unavailable for either game, because of retirement (Os du Randt), injury (Percy Montgomery, Fourie du Preez, Bakkies Botha), club commitments (Butch James), or other reasons (Victor Matfield), and the captain, John Smit, who had just joined French club ASM Clermont Auvergne, was released to play only in the first match.

Week 1
The first match, and the only one with full Test status, was against Wales, on 24 November 2007, at the Millennium Stadium. Although Wales had more possession and dominated territorially, they managed to score just two tries, both from kicks. The first was scored by Welsh full-back Morgan Stoddart, who was making his Test debut. The second, the result of a bad mistake by Springbok full-back Ruan Pienaar, was scored by Colin Charvis; it was his 22nd Test try, a new record for a forward in Test rugby. South Africa made better use of their more limited possession, scoring five tries, including one by Ryan Kankowski, also a Test debutant, as the world cup winners won the match 34–12.

Week 2
The second match, at Twickenham on 1 December 2007, saw a Springbok XV facing a Barbarians side that included such big names as Jerry Collins, Martyn Williams, Matt Giteau, and the retiring Jason Robinson. The Barbarians' plans were disrupted when the English Premier clubs decided not to allow players to be released, and the Irish provinces followed suit. As a result, Brian O'Driscoll, who had been named to captain the side, had to withdraw, as did Andrew Sheridan of Sale Sharks, but Mark Regan of Bristol defied the ban and led the Barbarians, an act for which he was later sanctioned by his club. The match itself proved to be somewhat one-sided affair, the lacklustre Springboks, who included just five World Cup final starters, losing 22–5 to a Barbarians side that played with flair and creativity. The Barabarians scored three tries, the South Africans only one, scored by Barend Pieterse, who was making his first appearance in a Springbok jersey in place of Schalk Burger, who had broken his nose in the game against Wales.

References

2007 rugby union tours
2007 in South African rugby union
2007
2007–08 in Welsh rugby union
2007–08 in English rugby union
2008
2008
2007–08 in European rugby union
November 2007 sports events in the United Kingdom
December 2007 sports events in the United Kingdom